Telatrygon is a genus of stingrays in the family Dasyatidae from the central Indo-Pacific. Its species were formerly contained within the genus Dasyatis.

Species
The placement of T. acutirostra within the genus is provisional pending further study.
Telatrygon acutirostra (Nishida & Nakaya, 1988) (sharpnose stingray)
Telatrygon biasa Last, White & Naylor, 2016 (Indonesian sharpnose ray)
Telatrygon crozieri (Blyth, 1860) (Indian sharpnose ray) 
Telatrygon zugei (Müller & Henle, 1841) (pale-edged stingray)

References

Dasyatidae
Taxa named by Bernadette Mabel Manjaji-Matsumoto